Dwarf angelfish can refer to:

 Centropyge, a genus of marine angelfishes.
 Paracentropyge, a genus of marine angelfishes.
 Pterophyllum leopoldi, a species of freshwater angelfish.